Maria Lê Thanh Lan, stage name Ngọc Lan "Jade Orchid" (Nha Trang, 28 December 1956 - California, 6 March 2001), was a famous overseas Vietnamese singer-lyricist known for covering nostalgic French-language love songs. Among her biggest hits included covers of  Mon amie la rose of Françoise Hardy, Johnny, Johnny of Jeanne Mas, Joe le taxi of Vanessa Paradis, Tombe la neige of Salvatore Adamo, Pour en arriver-là and Mourir sur scène of Dalida and Poupée de cire, poupée de son of France Gall.

Ngoc Lan is considered one of the most successful and famous singers in the Vietnamese music scene after 1975. Her style and style not only leave a deep impression in the audience but also contribute to the music. Minh Tuyet, Y Phuong, Lam Thuy Van.

Time Period

Ngoc Lan, whose real name is Le Thanh Lan, was born on 28 December 1956 in Nha Trang (also known as St. Maria Maria Le Thanh Lan). Ngoc Lan is the fifth of eight people in a well-off family, her father, Le Duc Mau, who served in the Armed Forces of the South Vietnamese Armed Forces. While in Vietnam, she listened to Le Hoang Long's music, studied music and performed on occasions in Nha Trang. She studied at Ly Thuong Kiet School, a suburb of Saigon.

Starting a business

In 1980, Ngoc Lan came to the United States and settled in Minnesota. Two years later, Ngoc Lan started her singing career in California. She chose the name Ngoc Lan because her real name, Thanh Lan, coincided with that of the famous singer Thanh Lan. With the introduction of singer Duy Quang, she sang at a number of cafe and concert. In the first day with the purpose of providing financial support to the family and the experience, she intended to quit the job and go help her family sell  hamburgers because she felt that her vocal cord does not allow her to sing too much. However, due to the continuous support and encouragement from family and friends, she continued her singing career which turned into an amazing success.

In the top of her career

With sweet liquid, lyrical, sad voice, Ngoc Lan was quickly known and recorded on average as the central sound of Da Lan, Ngoc Ngoc, and regularly displayed at the dance hall. , tea room ... Especially after collaborating with MayQ Productions and controlled by this center to perform a special program of Ngoc Lan 1: As you love him (1989) and Ngoc Lan 2 The sun over the summer (1991) by director Dang Tran Thuc, Ngoc Lan has reached a peak in professional music. The book's video on so far is still considered to be a very valuable book book on page art that is dedicated to an artist.

Ngoc Lan's success in off-the-cuff technology is her identity as her appearance dates back to the years when overseas music was "thirsty" for singers and new releases, the presence of girlfriends music style Songs of this period are very popular songs that have been successful with these songs before 1975 such as Khanh Ha, Tuan Ngoc, Duy Quang ... .. also contributions to your success. However, it is undeniably undeniable that her own talent and fortune is the age of the girls' names that are longer than sky music.

Success followed success, then in the 1980s and early 1990s, she accepted the invitation of the Asian Center to participate in the 15th Love Link CD, along with two other well-loved songs at that time, Kieu Nga, the CD has opened up the time of the song in style and favors things that are not available overseas without having to be in Vietnam, being listed as one of the highest sales numbers in the CD. center of this center CD Through, the name Ngoc Lan became increasingly popular.

At the same time, she was also invited to tour continuously, everywhere and has become the Top Female singer of the four-year festival since 1987 in the music community of the Vietnamese community across the five continents. Chieu Duong (Australia) posted on 14 September 1990 as follows:

"Over 3 nights of performances in Sydney and Melbourne, two of Australia's largest cities, singer Ngoc Lan was a huge success. Hall (Sydney) In Melbourne, more than 1500 spectators had to stand to see Ngoc Lan's performance. This year, since the music show in Australia, this is the largest show for singer Ngoc Lan.

After 3 consecutive nights in Sydney Zing Forum Zing Forum> Zing Forum> Manga Club> and Melbourne, possible to see the third party through the ticket, singer 1 Ngoc Lan decided to stay in Australia more One week for the program: Da Vu Ngoc Lan Fall from Australia

Death

After a long period of multiple sclerosis and limited vision, Ngoc Lan passed away at 8:25 am on 06 March 2001 at Vencor Hospital, Huntington Beach, Southern California.

References

20th-century Vietnamese women singers
1956 births
2001 deaths